The Park Hotels is a collection of contemporary luxury five-star boutique hotels in India belonging to the Apeejay Surrendra Group, headquartered in Kolkata, West Bengal, India. These hotels are located in Bangalore, Chennai, Hyderabad, Kolkata, Navi Mumbai, New Delhi, Visakhapatnam and Goa. New properties are under construction in Kochi, Kolkata (E.M. Bypass), Pune, Coimbatore and Jaipur.

Among these, The Park Kolkata was awarded the "National Tourism Award" (2003–04) for outstanding performance as the Best Boutique Hotel in the country by the Department of Tourism, Government of India. The Park Bangalore was designed by Terence Conran. The Park Kolkata under the flagship of Park Hotels won The Best Business Hotel award at Travel+ leisure India south Asia's luxury travel event 'India's Best Awards 2018' in New Delhi

List of The Park Hotels in India

History

The hotel business was started by Surrendra Paul in 1967, with the opening of the group's first hotel, The Park, a 150-room hotel on the fashionable Park Street in Kolkata, on 1 November; the hotel at Visakhapatnam was added in 1968, while The Park New Delhi commenced operations in 1987. After the death of Surrendra Paul, his daughter Priya Paul succeeded him in 1990. Subsequently, The Park Bangalore was added in 2000, while The Park Chennai was commissioned in 2002.

The Park New Delhi, took up the restoration of the 1724 built astronomical observatory, Jantar Mantar, in 2000, after an MoU with the Archaeological Survey of India (ASI).

In 2006, Forbes, listed "Atrium" in The Park Chennai, with its menu designed by Italian chef Antonio Carluccio, amongst India's top 10 Most Expensive Restaurants. In 2010, The Independent, listed The Park Hyderabad amongst its list of "100 holiday ideas for 2010".

References

Hotel chains in India
Hotels in Bangalore
Indian companies established in 1967
1967 establishments in West Bengal